"Sorry, Blame It on Me" is the fifth single from R&B singer/songwriter Akon's second studio album, Konvicted (Deluxe Edition). The song was co-written and produced by Clinton Sparks. This song was made after the nightclub incident in which Akon did a sexual dance with an underage girl. A demo of the song was leaked in February 2007, several months before the official version became available on Akon's Myspace. The song was put on iTunes on July 17, 2007. The song attained the number one position on iTunes on July 21, 2007 and July 23, 2007. The song was released to radio on July 24, 2007. The song debuted on the August 4, 2007 issue of the Billboard Hot 100 at number seven, unable to make as big of impact as Akon's previous single Don't Matter.   A music video directed by Chris Robinson was produced to promote the single.

Track listing
 "Sorry, Blame It on Me" - 4:57

Charts

Weekly charts

Year-end charts

Certifications

References

2007 singles
Akon songs
Music videos directed by Chris Robinson (director)
Pop ballads
Songs written by Akon
Songs written by Clinton Sparks
2006 songs
Interscope Records singles
Konvict Muzik singles